An aluminide is a compound that has aluminium with more electropositive elements. Since aluminium is near the nonmetals on the periodic table, it can bond with metals differently from other metals. The properties of an aluminide are between those of a metal alloy and those of an ionic compound.

Examples
 Magnesium aluminide, MgAl
 Titanium aluminide, TiAl
 Iron aluminides, including Fe3Al and FeAl
 Nickel aluminide, Ni3Al

See category for a list.

Intermetallics